Tamara Esteri Almeida (born 24 August 1966) is a Cuban fencer. She competed in the women's individual and team épée events at the 1996 and 2000 Summer Olympics.

References

1966 births
Living people
Cuban female épée fencers
Olympic fencers of Cuba
Fencers at the 1996 Summer Olympics
Fencers at the 2000 Summer Olympics
Sportspeople from Havana
Pan American Games medalists in fencing
Pan American Games gold medalists for Cuba
Pan American Games silver medalists for Cuba
Fencers at the 1987 Pan American Games
Medalists at the 1987 Pan American Games
20th-century Cuban women
20th-century Cuban people
21st-century Cuban women